Rangel Ravelo (born April 24, 1992) is a Cuban professional baseball first baseman and outfielder in the San Diego Padres organization. He has played in Major League Baseball (MLB) for the St. Louis Cardinals and in Nippon Professional Baseball (NPB) for the Orix Buffaloes.

Career

Chicago White Sox
Ravelo was drafted by the Chicago White Sox in the sixth round of the 2010 Major League Baseball draft out of Hialeah High School in Hialeah, Florida. He signed with the White Sox and made his professional debut with the Bristol White Sox. In 2011, he played for Bristol and Kannapolis Intimidators and also spent 2012 with Kannapolis. He returned to Kannapolis to start 2013 and was promoted to the Winston-Salem Dash early in the season. Ravelo played 2014 with the Double-A Birmingham Barons. During the season, he had a 26-game hitting streak. After the season, he was named the Barons Player of the Year after hitting .309 with a .859 on-base plus slugging (OPS) and 11 home runs.

Oakland Athletics
After the 2014 season, the White Sox traded Ravelo, Josh Phegley, Marcus Semien, and Chris Bassitt to the Oakland Athletics in exchange for Jeff Samardzija and Michael Ynoa. He played for three Athletics affiliates in 2015: the Arizona League Athletics, Double-A Midland RockHounds, and Triple-A Nashville Sounds. He spent the entire 2016 season with Nashville, finishing with a .262 batting average with 8 home runs and 54 RBI. He was designated for assignment and sent outright to Nashville after the season. The A's invited him to spring training in 2017 as a non-roster player. With no natural position to play at Triple-A, due to Matt Olson's full-time first base assignment, and being too advanced for Double-A, Ravelo was released before the start of the season.

St. Louis Cardinals
On April 7, 2017, Ravelo signed a minor league contract with the St. Louis Cardinals, and was assigned to the Memphis Redbirds, where he spent the whole season, posting a .314 batting average with eight home runs and 41 RBIs. in 89 games.  He returned to Memphis in 2018, slashing .308/.392/.487 with 13 home runs and 67 RBIs in 100 games. He returned to Memphis to begin 2019. St. Louis promoted Ravelo to the major leagues on June 17, 2019. On September 5, 2019, Ravelo hit his first career Major League home run off of former Cardinals farmhand Kyle Barraclough in the 8th inning of a win against the San Francisco Giants. Over 39 regular season at-bats with St. Louis, Ravelo hit .205 with two home runs and seven RBIs. Over 95 games with Memphis, he slashed .299/.383/.473 with 12 home runs and 56 RBIs.

Ravelo began the 2020 season with St. Louis. On August 4, 2020, it was announced that he had tested positive for COVID-19. In 35 at-bats over 13 games for St. Louis in 2020, Ravelo slashed .189/.250/.351 with one home run and 6 RBI. On December 2, Ravelo was nontendered by the Cardinals.
After the 2020 season, he played for Águilas Cibaeñas of the Dominican Professional Baseball League (LIDOM). He has also played for Dominican Republic in the 2021 Caribbean Series.

Los Angeles Dodgers
On January 9, 2021, Ravelo signed a minor league contract with the Los Angeles Dodgers organization. He was assigned to the Triple-A Oklahoma City Dodgers, where he slashed a torrid .407/.504/.758 with 8 home runs and 27 RBI in 26 games. On June 14, 2021, the Dodgers agreed to sell Ravelo's contract to a team in Nippon Professional Baseball (NPB) so Ravelo could pursue an opportunity in Japan.

Orix Buffaloes
On June 17, 2021, Ravelo signed with the Orix Buffaloes of Nippon Professional Baseball (NPB). He became a free agent after the 2022 season.

San Diego Padres
On February 8, 2023, Ravelo signed a minor league contract with the San Diego Padres with an invitation to spring training.

References

External links

 Career statistics - NPB.jp
 42 ランへル・ラベロ 選手名鑑2021 - Orix Buffaloes Official site 

1992 births
Living people
Águilas Cibaeñas players
Cuban expatriate baseball players in the Dominican Republic
Arizona League Athletics players
Baseball players from Florida
Birmingham Barons players
Bristol White Sox players
Cardenales de Lara players
Cuban expatriate baseball players in Venezuela
Kannapolis Intimidators players
Leones del Escogido players
Major League Baseball first basemen
Major League Baseball players from Cuba
Cuban expatriate baseball players in the United States
Memphis Redbirds players
Midland RockHounds players
Nashville Sounds players
Nippon Professional Baseball infielders
Orix Buffaloes players
Baseball players from Havana
St. Louis Cardinals players
Winston-Salem Dash players
Oklahoma City Dodgers players